Two Harbors is a city in and the county seat of Lake County, Minnesota, United States, along the shore of Lake Superior. The population was 3,633 at the 2020 census. Minnesota State Highway 61 serves as a main route in Two Harbors.

History

In the early years Two Harbors consisted of two separate communities, Agate Bay and Burlington. The village of Burlington along Burlington Bay was platted in 1856, first incorporated on May 23, 1857; it had a post office that operated from 1856 until 1862. The first residence constructed in Agate Bay was owned by Thomas Sexton (1854); it was a 14-by-16-foot shack. Early settlers lived in primitive conditions, which was common for both the area and time. Their homes were made of logs and had dirt floors. Diets often consisted of homegrown vegetables and animals caught in the area (at that time there were many dense forests, so deer meat was not an abundant food source). The village of Agate Bay was created with the construction camp as work on the new railroad began in 1883. The village of Two Harbors was platted in 1885 but not incorporated until 1888. Early transportation to the village was by boats under contract with the new Duluth and Iron Range Railroad, and by horse. It took one day to get from Duluth to Two Harbors. By 1886 the D&IR completed the Lake Division connecting Duluth and Two Harbors with passenger service that extended to Ely. Thirty-five logging camps were set up within the vicinity, one of them on Fourth Avenue. On February 26, 1907, the village reincorporated as the City of Two Harbors.

The town's history is included in the Lake County Historical Depot Museum.

Whiskey Row

By 1883 the Minnesota Iron Company had purchased all but four acres of Thomas Sexton's land around Agate Bay. Sexton leased his remaining four acres to merchants seeking to capitalize on the 600-man workforce arriving to build the Duluth & Iron Range Railroad. He divided his four acres into 32 lots. As with any frontier town of the day it was a largely male population. The infamous four-acre plot earned the nickname "Whiskey Row", and was said to exist for the sole purpose of "relieving a man from his pay".

Contrary to popular myth, Whiskey Row was not destroyed by a fire in 1888. There was a fire but it occurred before the first load of ore arrived in July 1884 and only seven buildings were damaged. It was reported that the merchants affected were in Duluth the next day purchasing materials to rebuild. Whiskey Row's demise occurred the following year.

The railroad rapidly expanded its rail and shipping operations and needed all of the shoreline for its new coal handling and storage facility. By 1885 the Minnesota Iron Company convinced Sexton to sell his remaining four acres along Agate Bay. The railroad then simply evicted the tenants and moved any of the salvageable buildings inland. There are several homes in "east" Two Harbors whose original structures were on Whiskey Row.

Railroad

Had it not been for the discovery of nearby iron ore, Two Harbors would not exist. The Minnesota Iron Company bought  of land in order to build their railroad. In Agate Bay (Two Harbors) most of the land was bought from Sexton, who by that time had owned the land for 20 years.

Various locations were considered for the railroad terminus and shipping port, but Agate Bay was chosen because it was closer to the iron ore site and had a clay bottom bay, while most others were rocky.

As the track was being developed, the main transportation route was Lake Superior. This proved difficult when heavy loads such as railroad engines nearly sank the scows or tugs that carried them. The contractor John. S. Wolfe was told he would receive a bonus of $50,000 if the railroad was completed by August 1, 1884. Because that was a Friday, and construction workers had strong superstitions about Fridays, it became important that the construction be completed by July 31. On that day, the first iron ore cars left Agate Bay early in the morning, along with a caboose for President Tower to ride in on the return trip. The railway between Duluth and Two Harbors was completed in 1886.

The North Shore Scenic Railroad operates a six-hour excursion starting in Duluth that has a two-hour break in Two Harbors.

A 2-6-0 Mogul class steam locomotive with the first style of ore cars and caboose is on display by the historic Duluth and Iron Range depot.

A 2-8-8-4 Yellowstone class steam locomotive is on display at Two Harbors. It ranks among the largest steam locomotives ever built.

Mayoral recall 
In 2022, incumbent mayor Chris Swanson was recalled; over 86% of voters voted to remove him after a series of controversies. City Council President Ben Redden has taken over the mayor's duties pending a special election to choose a replacement.

Geography

Climate
Two Harbors is 20 miles northeast of the city of Duluth. It is along Lake Superior, which contributes the two natural harbors for which Two Harbors is named, Burlington Bay and Agate Bay. The warmest month in the year is July, the coldest January.
According to the Minnesota Department of Natural Resources (DNR), Two Harbors is in a region called the Laurentian Mixed Forest Province, which contains broad areas of coniferous forest, mixed hardwood, and conifer bogs and swamps.

Demographics

2010 census
As of the census of 2010, there were 3,745 people, 1,649 households, and 951 families residing in the city. The racial makeup of the city was 97.2% White, 0.2% African American, 0.6% Native American, 0.2% Asian, 0.2% from other races, and 1.5% from two or more races. Hispanic or Latino of any race were 1.0% of the population.

There were 1,649 households, of which 27.0% had children under the age of 18 living with them, 43.5% were married couples living together, 10.6% had a female householder with no husband present, 3.6% had a male householder with no wife present, and 42.3% were non-families. 36.7% of all households were made up of individuals, and 17.4% had someone living alone who was 65 years of age or older. The average household size was 2.19 and the average family size was 2.85.

The median age in the city was 41.3 years. 22% of residents were under the age of 18; 8% were between the ages of 18 and 24; 23.9% were from 25 to 44; 25.1% were from 45 to 64; and 21.1% were 65 years of age or older. The gender makeup of the city was 47.4% male and 52.6% female.

2000 census
As of the census of 2000, there were 3,613 people, 1,636 households, and 953 families residing in the city. The racial makeup of the city was 98.06% White, 0.06% African American, 0.66% Native American, 0.11% Asian, 0.08% from other races, and 1.02% from two or more races. Hispanic or Latino of any race were 0.61% of the population. 19.4% were of Norwegian, 18.0% Swedish, 12.2% German, 9.6% Finnish, 8.0% Irish and 5.7% English ancestry.

There were 1,523 households, out of which 29.7% had children under the age of 18 living with them, 48.9% were married couples living together, 10.4% had a female householder with no husband present, and 37.4% were non-families. 32.0% of all households were made up of individuals, and 16.0% had someone living alone who was 65 years of age or older.  The average household size was 2.27 and the average family size was 2.86.

In the city, the population was spread out, with 23.0% under the age of 18, 8.1% from 18 to 24, 24.8% from 25 to 44, 22.5% from 45 to 64, and 21.6% who were 65 years of age or older.  The median age was 41 years. For every 100 females, there were 86.9 males.  For every 100 females age 18 and over, there were 83.0 males.

The median income for a household in the city was $37,708, and the median income for a family was $47,113. Males had a median income of $39,712 versus $29,076 for females. The per capita income for the city was $19,793.  About 7.2% of families and 9.5% of the population were below the poverty line, including 15.7% of those under age 18 and 4.3% of those age 65 or over.

Industry
Granite Gear, started in 1986, produces heavy-duty backpacks for the military and outdoors.

Former industries

Cigar factories
In 1900, John H. Kallin built Two Harbors Cigar Factory on the 100 block of 7th Street. The local trade alone required about 30,000 cigars each month. They came in eight regular brands and five specialty. In 1907 Ed Sorenson built Sorenson Cigar Factory. Neither factory is still in operation.

Universal Fiberglass
In 1964 the abandoned DM&IR railroad buildings were used to open Universal Fiberglass. Producing three wheel mailsters for the United States Postal Service was their main contract, worth millions. Car fenders and like objects were also produced. When a fire caused enough damage that they could no longer fulfill their contract, the GSA shut them down. The property was sold at a public auction.

Bottling works
Two Harbors Bottling works began in 1912. It offered flavors of pop such as cream soda, ginger ale, cider, and seltzer water. The company became especially known for its strawberry pop's unique flavor—a creamier and more natural one than the rest. This business is no longer running.

3M
3M, originally known as Minnesota Mining and Manufacturing Company, was started by five men from Two Harbors. When the founders thought they had found mineral called corundum, which could be used to make sandpaper, they began setting up a mining company. The five were Henry S. Bryan, J. Danley Budd, Herman Cable, William McGonagle, and John Dwan. To get the company started they erected a large dock, crushing mill and bunk and storage houses. After selling the corundum to a company in Chicago the men learned that it wasn't really corundum and moved on to other ventures. In 1905 the company was moved to Duluth and in 1907 to St. Paul. It still had ties in Two Harbors until Dwan's death. Now the only tie 3M has to Two Harbors is a museum in Dwan's original office. The museum is in 3M's original building. Exhibits include Dwan's recreated office and other artifacts; a history of the company including photos and documents; a "lab" area representing the establishment of research and development, product diversification and growth; and hands-on interactive programs and technology applications. The original office building has been restored and is listed on the National Register of Historic Places.

Arts and culture

Edna G.
Built in 1896, the Edna G. was named after the president of the railroad's daughter, Edna Greatsinger, this tug is "one of a kind". The Edna G. stayed in Two Harbors its entire working career except for a small stint during World War I it spent two years on the east coast moving warships around.  Until its retirement in 1981, the Edna G. was the last coal-fired, steam-powered tugboat in operation of the Great Lakes.  The boat is listed on the National Register of Historic Places. Tours of this vessel are available from trained guides in the spring-fall from 10am to 5pm.  A trip includes a visit to the engine room, and seeing the pilot house, where the passengers are allowed to blow the horn.

John Beargrease
Mok-qua Bennete, also known as John Beargrease, was an Ojibwe man who delivered mail between Two Harbors and Grand Marais. The John Beargrease Dog Sled Race was started as a tribute to him for his role in the early history of the North Shore of Lake Superior. The race covers nearly 400 miles between Duluth and Grand Portage. It is traditionally held in the last week of January.

Other
Two Harbors hosts the Lake County Fair and Heritage Days, and is one of the checkpoints for the Beargrease Sled Dog Marathon, as well as the starting line for Grandma's Marathon and the NorthShore Inline Marathon. Dean L. Hovey wrote a mystery, Whistling Pines (2012), set in a fictional Two Harbors senior living center, and two sequels, Whistling Sousa (2013) and Whistling Wings (2018).

Library
The Two Harbors Public Library opened in 1909 as a Carnegie Library with a $15,000 grant from Andrew Carnegie. Before that, the books were shuffled from space to space in a variety of city offices. In 1983, an addition was added to the library, providing street access and a total of 8,000 square feet. The library houses over 30,000 books, magazines, CDs, audiobooks, and DVDs. The Archives Room contains photographic collections and local newspapers dating to the late 1890s. Residents of Two Harbors and the surrounding rural area are served by the library and, through the library's membership, the Arrowhead Library System.

Parks and recreation
Two Harbors has five community parks. They have picnic tables, baseball, soccer, and football fields, and playground equipment. The Thomas Owens Park houses the city's bandshell, home of the Two Harbors City Band, Minnesota's oldest city band.

Two Harbors is the gateway city to the North Shore of Minnesota. Highway 61 is the only major highway heading north/northeast along Lake Superior's shore and is the fastest way to the North Shore's eight state parks, as well as wayside rests and lakeshore access. The parks are Gooseberry Falls, Split Rock Lighthouse, Tettegouche, George H. Crosby Manitou State Park, Temperance River State Park, Cascade River State Park, Judge C.R. Magney State Park, and Grand Portage State Park.

Trails
Two Harbors offers access to Minnesota trails. The Sonju hiking trail can be used to view the Two Harbors shoreline. North Shore State Snowmobile Trail includes scenic views for snowmobilers, as do the Yukon Snowmobile Trail and Brimson Snowmobile Trail. There is also the Erkki Harju Ski Trail.

Government and politics
Lake County Search and Rescue is a division of Lake County's Sheriff department. It was created in 1971 and placed in Two Harbors. Its formation was helped by Silver Bay Search and Rescue. Its first meeting place was a room at the depot, from which it moved to the old Svee Distributing building at 616 3rd Avenue. In 1980 it took over the former U.S. Forestry Service garage complex on 16th Avenue.

Education
In 1901, Two Harbors decided it needed a high school. On February 12, 1902, Two Harbors Central High School was dedicated at a cost of $35,025. It was on the 400 block of Fourth Avenue, and had 50 students and three teachers. The first students to graduate were Mary Rylander and Ann Paulson. The school taught arithmetic, grammar, and American history. Very little English was taught at the time. In 1903 Latin and music were introduced. Courses in science and sewing were added in 1906. Manual training and domestic services were introduced in 1908. By 1909 the school had 98 students and seven teachers. By 1910 the school library had 7,000 books. Plans for a new building were announced in 1935, at an estimated $100,000. The original Central High School was demolished and the new building was completed in 1939. At completion, and after all additions were made, the total cost was $585,000. A referendum for a new building two miles (3 km) north of town on Lake County Highway 2 (CR 2) was passed in 2003. Building was completed and classes began in 2005. Students use the hiking trails in the woods, around ponds, and the football field. The former high school on 4th Avenue was demolished in 2008.

Notable people
Philip Berrigan - Catonsville Nine member born here. (His brother Daniel was born in a nearby town)
Rhonda Britten  -  Actress, best-selling author, motivational speaker and coach Starting Over born here
Leroy Goldsworthy - NHL player. First Minnesotan to get his name on the Stanley Cup.
Warren E. Hastings - politician and locomotive engineer, lived in Two Harbors.
Jeremy Mayer - Sculptor, subject of the documentary California Typewriter, attended middle and high school here.
Don Moen – Singer/songwriter, attended and graduated from Two Harbors High School
Lute Olson – Hall of Fame college basketball coach, coached the Two Harbors High School basketball team from 1957 to 1961
August Omtvedt - politician and businessman, lived in Two Harbors
Esther Rose (born Esther Holbeck) - Western artist born in Two Harbors.
Joseph Edward Therrien, politician and businessman, lived in Two Harbors.
Johnny Western - Singer, songwriter, musician and actor, born here.

References

External links

 City of Two Harbors

Cities in Minnesota
Minnesota populated places on Lake Superior
County seats in Minnesota
Cities in Lake County, Minnesota
Mining communities in Minnesota
1885 establishments in Minnesota